Ethanethiol, commonly known as ethyl mercaptan, is an organosulfur compound with the formula CH3CH2SH. is a colorless liquid with a distinct odor. Abbreviated EtSH, it consists of an ethyl group (Et), CH3CH2, attached to a thiol group, SH. Its structure parallels that of ethanol, but with sulfur in place of oxygen. The odor of EtSH is infamous. Ethanethiol is more volatile than ethanol due to a diminished ability to engage in hydrogen bonding. Ethanethiol is toxic in high concentrations. It occurs naturally as a minor component of petroleum, and may be added to otherwise odorless gaseous products such as liquefied petroleum gas (LPG) to help warn of gas leaks. At these concentrations, ethanethiol is not harmful.

Preparation
Ethanethiol is prepared by the reaction of ethene with hydrogen sulfide over a catalyst.  The various producers utilize different catalysts in this process.  It has also been prepared commercially by the reaction of ethanol with hydrogen sulfide gas over an acidic solid catalyst, such as alumina.

Ethanethiol was originally reported by Zeise in 1834.  Zeise treated calcium ethyl sulfate with a suspension of barium sulfide saturated with hydrogen sulfide.  He is credited with naming the C2H5S- group as mercaptum.

Ethanethiol can also be prepared by a halide displacement reaction, where ethyl halide is treated with aqueous sodium bisulfide.  This conversion was demonstrated as early as 1840 by Henri Victor Regnault.

Odor
Ethanethiol has a strongly disagreeable odor that humans can detect in minute concentrations. The threshold for human detection is as low as one part in 2.8 billion parts of air (0.36 parts per billion). Its odor resembles that of leeks, onions, durian or cooked cabbage, but is quite distinct.

Employees of the Union Oil Company of California reported first in 1938 that turkey vultures would gather at the site of any gas leak. After finding that this was caused by traces of ethanethiol in the gas it was decided to boost the amount of ethanethiol in the gas, to make detection of leaks easier.

Uses
Ethanethiol is intentionally added to butane and propane (see: LPG) to impart an easily noticed smell to these normally odorless fuels that pose the threat of fire, explosion, and asphyxiation.

In the underground mining industry, ethanethiol or ethyl mercaptan is referred to as "stench gas".  The gas is released into mine ventilation systems during an emergency to alert mine workers. In Ontario, mining legislation dictates that "The alarm system in an underground mine shall, consist of the introduction into all workplaces of sufficient quantities of ethyl mercaptan gas or similar gas to be readily detectable by all workers".

Reactions

Ethanethiol is a reagent in organic synthesis. In the presence of sodium hydroxide, it gives the powerful nucleophile EtS−. The salt can be generated quantitatively by reaction with sodium hydride.

Ethanethiol can be oxidized to ethyl sulfonic acid, using strong oxidizing agents. Weaker oxidants, such as ferric oxide or hydrogen peroxide give the disulfide, diethyl disulfide:
2 EtSH + H2O2 → EtS-SEt + 2 H2O
Like other thiols, it behaves comparably to hydrogen sulfide. For example, it binds, concomitant with deprotonation to "soft" transition metal cations, such as Hg2+, Cu+, and Ni2+ to give polymeric thiolato complexes, Hg(SEt)2, CuSEt, and Ni(SEt)2, respectively.

See also
 tert-Butylthiol (tert-butyl mercaptan)
 Butanethiol (butyl mercaptan)

References

External links
 NLM Hazardous Substances Databank – Ethyl mercaptan
 CDC - NIOSH Pocket Guide to Chemical Hazards

Flavors
Alkanethiols
Foul-smelling chemicals